Meredith Creek (also known as Brookside Run) is a tributary of the Lackawanna River in Lackawanna County, Pennsylvania, in the United States. The creek is highly impacted by mining and experiences some flow loss. It is a small, first-order stream. Historic sites such as the New York, Ontario and Western Rail Yard and the Brookside Cemetery are in the creek's watershed.

Course
Meredith Creek begins in Carbondale Township. It flows east for a short distance, almost immediately entering Carbondale and flowing along the border between in and Carbondale Township. Several hundred feet further downstream, it turns southeast for a short distance, reentering Carbondale Township and crossing a highway. The creek then reaches its confluence with the Lackawanna River.

Meredith Creek joins the Lackawanna River approximately  upriver of its mouth.

Hydrology, geography and geology

Meredith Creek is highly impacted by strip mining and experiences flow loss. However, it does retain its channel. Perennial flow could be restored to Meredith Creek by lining the creek and regrading strip mine pits along it.

A portion of a mountain known as West Mountain is in the watershed of Meredith Creek.

Watershed
Meredith Creek is entirely within the United States Geological Survey quadrangle of Carbondale.

Meredith Creek is a small first-order stream. In the early 2000s, the Lackawanna River Watershed Conservation Plan stated that the Lackawanna Valley Conservancy was available "to help plan and manage a greenway project" for the creek.

History
Meredith Creek was entered into the Geographic Names Information System on May 4, 1998. Its identifier in the Geographic Names Information System is 1793648. The creek is also known as Brookside Run.

The former New York, Ontario and Western Rail Yard is located at the mouth of Meredith Creek. A historic burial ground known as the Brookside Cemetery is also in the creek's watershed. During or shortly before the early 2000s, some improvements were made to the cemetery site. This cemetery is described as a " cultural resource" in the Lackawanna River Watershed Conservation Plan".

In the early 2000s, the Lackawanna River Watershed Conservation Plan recommended that Carbondale Township and Carbondale include protection of Meredith Creek in their comprehensive plans, as well as their ordinances for land use, zoning, and subdivision.

See also
Lees Creek (Lackawanna River), next tributary of the Lackawanna River going downriver
Fall Brook (Lackawanna River), next tributary of the Lackawanna River going upriver
List of rivers of Pennsylvania
List of tributaries of the Lackawanna River

Notes

References

External links
Google Street View image of Meredith Creek

Rivers of Lackawanna County, Pennsylvania
Tributaries of the Lackawanna River
Rivers of Pennsylvania